Anna Alfhild Tamm (16 May 1876 – 1 November 1959), was a Swedish physician and the first female psychiatrist in Sweden.

Life 
Tamm graduated in Stockholm in 1895, acquired her medical license at Karolinska institutet in 1905 and, after having been approved by the nerve clinic at the Serafimerlasarettet in 1908, she was active in Stockholm in 1909–1946.

Tamm was a student of Sigmund Freud and belonged to those introducing the psychoanalysis in Sweden. She had a special interest in speaking disorders.  Together with Freud she founded the Finnish-Swedish Psychoanalytical Society in 1934 in Stockholm, under the auspices of the Independent practice association.

Personal life 
She was in a relationship with a woman for many years.

References

Sources
Tamm, Anna Alfhild i Alfred Levertin, Svenskt porträttgalleri (1911), volym XIII. Läkarekåren
Svenska män och kvinnor, band 7 (1954)
Svensk uppslagsbok, band 28 (1954)

Further reading 
 

1876 births
1959 deaths
Swedish women physicians
Swedish psychiatrists
Analysands of Helene Deutsch
Analysands of August Aichhorn
Analysands of Paul Federn
20th-century Swedish physicians
LGBT physicians
Swedish LGBT scientists
Swedish psychoanalysts
Swedish women psychiatrists
20th-century women physicians
20th-century Swedish women
Burials at Norra begravningsplatsen